Xylia is a genus of flowering plants in the family Fabaceae. It is native to Sub-Saharan Africa, South Asia, and Mainland Southeast Asia.

Species
Xylia includes nine accepted species:
 Xylia africana Harms
 Xylia evansii Hutch.
 Xylia fraterna (Vatke) Drake
 Xylia ghesquierei Robyns
 Xylia hoffmannii (Vatke) Drake
 Xylia mendoncae Torre (found in Mozambique)
 Xylia schliebenii Harms
 Xylia torreana Brenan (found in Malawi, Mozambique, South Africa, and Zimbabwe)
 Xylia xylocarpa (Roxb.) Taub. (found in Indochina)

And one unresolved species:
 Xylia perieri Drake

References

 
Fabaceae genera
Taxonomy articles created by Polbot